8th Armored may refer to:

8th Panzer Division (Wehrmacht)
8th Armored Brigade (Israel)
8th Armoured Brigade (United Kingdom)
8th Armoured Division (United Kingdom)
8th Armored Division (United States)